was a Japanese lunisolar calendar (genka reki).  It was published in 1797.

History
The  Kansei-reki system was the work of Takahashi Yoshitoki and Hazama Shigetomi.

Takahashi and Hazama used Western astronomy studies to modify the traditional calendar.

See also
 Japanese calendar
 Sexagenary cycle
 Kansei

References

External links
 National Diet Library, "The Japanese Calendar"

Specific calendars
History of science and technology in Japan
Time in Japan